Allegra Lapi (born ) is an Italian water polo player.

She was a member of the Italy women's national water polo team at the 2012 Summer Olympics.
She also competed at the 2011 World Aquatics Championships.

References

External links

1985 births
Living people
People from Bagno a Ripoli
Italian female water polo players
Water polo players at the 2012 Summer Olympics
Olympic water polo players of Italy
Sportspeople from the Metropolitan City of Florence
21st-century Italian women